"They Don't Care About Us" is a song by American singer and songwriter Michael Jackson, released in April 16, 1996 as the fifth single from his ninth album, HIStory: Past, Present and Future, Book I (1995). It is a protest song and remains one of the most controversial pieces Jackson ever composed. In the US, media scrutiny surrounding  allegations of antisemitic lyrics were the catalyst for Jackson issuing multiple clarifications, an apology, defense from director Spike Lee and re-releasing the song with a new vocal featuring altered lyrics. The singer countered allegations of antisemitism, arguing that reviews had misinterpreted the context of the song, either unintentionally or deliberately.

"They Don't Care About Us" was accompanied by two music videos directed by Lee. The first was shot in two locations in Brazil: in Pelourinho, the historic city center of Salvador; and in Santa Marta, a favela of Rio de Janeiro. State authorities tried to ban  production over fears the video would damage their image, the area and prospects of Rio de Janeiro staging the 2004 Olympics. Still, the residents of the area were happy to see the singer, hoping their problems would be made visible to a wider audience. The second video was shot in a prison and contained video footage of multiple references to human rights abuses.

Commercially, "They Don't Care About Us" became a top ten hit in European countries and number one in the Czech Republic, Germany, Hungary and Italy. In the US, the song peaked at number 30 on the Billboard Hot 100.

"They Don't Care About Us" was performed as part of a medley with "Scream" and "In the Closet" during Jackson's third and final concert series, the HIStory World Tour, which ran from 1996 to 1997. The song was set to be performed on Jackson's This Is It comeback concert series at The O2 Arena in London from July 2009 to March 2010, but the shows were cancelled due to his sudden death in June 2009. "They Don't Care About Us" was remixed with parts of songs such as "Privacy" (from the album Invincible) and "Tabloid Junkie" (from HIStory), and released on the Immortal album, in November 2011.

The song gained renewed attention and relevance due to its use during Black Lives Matter protests in 2014 and 2015, and again in 2020.

Music and composition
The song begins with a group of children singing the chorus, "All I wanna say is that they don't really care about us". In between the chorus lines, one child chants, "Don't worry what people say, we know the truth", after which another child says, "Enough is enough of this garbage!" It is played in the key of D minor and the track's time signature is common time. The song, which is cited as being a pop song, has a moderately slow tempo of 90 beats per minute. Instruments used include synthesizers, percussion and guitar.

Critical reception
Larry Flick from Billboard noted that the song's much-documented offending words were obscured by sound effects. He wrote, "With or without those words, this song comes across as less an intended indictment of the world's oppressive forced and more as lightly shrouded ramblings of personal paranoia. There is nothing wrong with an artist pouring personal experience into a song, of course, but the range of emotion displayed in Jackson's snarling vocal would be far more affecting within a more direct lyrical context." A reviewer from Music Week rated "They Don't Care About Us" four out of five, adding, "With echoes of Bad, Jackson's next single from HIStory sees him in tougher mode, with some real raucous guitar backing his soaring vocals." The magazine's Alan Jones described it as "a slim, sylph-like tirade, economical and angry." He concluded, "The quality of the song is there however, and Jacko's on a roll. Number one?" Jim Farber of New York Daily News said that Jackson "snarled" while singing, that the song "clicked" and has an "original clattering rhythm". 

Jon Pareles from The New York Times stated that Jackson was calling himself "a victim of police brutality" and a "victim of hate". He continued, "A listener might wonder just who 'Us' is supposed to be ... To make the songs lodge in the ear, Jackson uses elementary singsong melodies – a 'nyah, nyah' two-note motif in 'They Don't Care About Us' ... and he comes up with all kinds of surprises in the arrangements". James Hunter of Rolling Stone magazine noted that, musically, Jackson was no longer trying to hide any eccentricities he had and added that, with "They Don't Care About Us", the pop musician sounded more embattled than ever. The review of HIStory in The Washington Times noted of "They Don't Care About Us": "[it] follows fast, inviting more pathos – and more controversy. With haunting clapping and a police scanner in the background". The Sacramento Bee described it as a "looped reggae-lite dance beat".

Chart performance
In the United Kingdom, "They Don't Care About Us" peaked at number four on the UK Singles Chart and stayed on the chart for three months.

The song found particular success in the rest of Europe, peaking within the top ten in all countries, except in Spain, where it peaked at number 11 and remained in the chart for just one week. European highlights came in Austria, Switzerland, France, Belgium and Sweden, where the song became a top five hit and stayed in each country's respective charts for a minimum of 21 weeks. The song reached the top of the charts for three weeks in Germany and stayed a full 30 weeks in the survey, marking the longest consecutive chart run of a Michael Jackson song in the German charts.

The lyrical controversy surrounding "They Don't Care About Us" brought partial commercial disappointment in the US. It peaked at number 30 on the US Billboard Hot 100 chart, falling short of the record breaking success of the two previous singles, "Scream/Childhood" and "You Are Not Alone", yet the song peaked at number 10 on the US Billboard Hot R&B Singles chart.

Music videos

Producing the first music video for "They Don't Care About Us" proved to be a difficult task for Jackson. State authorities unsuccessfully tried to ban the singer filming in Salvador (Pelourinho) and in Rio de Janeiro. Officials in the state of Rio feared images of poverty might affect tourism and accused Jackson of exploiting the poor. Ronaldo Cezar Coelho, the state secretary for Industry, Commerce and Tourism, demanded editing rights over the finished product, stating, "I don't see why we should have to facilitate films that will contribute nothing to all our efforts to rehabilitate Rio's image". Some were concerned that scenes of poverty and human rights abuses would affect their chances of hosting the Olympics in 2004. Others supported Jackson's wish to highlight the problems of the region, arguing that the government were embarrassed by their own failings.

A judge banned all filming but this ruling was overturned by an injunction. Although officials were angry, the residents were not and Jackson was surrounded by crowds of enthusiastic onlookers during filming. One woman managed to push through security to hug Jackson who continued dancing while hugging her. Another woman appeared and hugged him from behind. He then fell to the ground as police pulled the two women off him and escorted them away. After the director helped Jackson get up off the street, he continued to sing and dance. This incident made it into the music video. 1,500 policemen and 50 residents acting as security guards effectively sealed off the Santa Marta favela. Some residents and officials found it offensive that Jackson's production team had negotiated with drug dealers in order to gain permission to film in one of the city's shantytowns.

The music video was directed by Spike Lee. Asked why he chose Lee to direct the video, Jackson responded, "'They Don't Care About Us' has an edge, and Spike Lee had approached me. It's a public awareness song and that's what he is all about. It's a protest kind of song ... and I think he was perfect for it".

Jackson also collaborated with 200 members of the cultural group Olodum, who "swayed to the heavy beat of Salvador's 'samba-reggae' music". The media interest surrounding the music video exposed Olodum to 140 countries around the world, bringing them worldwide fame and increased credibility in Brazil. At the beginning of the video, a Brazilian woman says, "Michael, eles não ligam pra gente" (Portuguese for "Michael, they don't care about us"), recorded by Angélica Vieira, producer of Manhattan Connection.

Speaking of the music video, in The New Brazilian Cinema, Lúcia Nagib observed:

In 2009, Billboard described the area as "now a model for social development" and claimed that Jackson's influence was partially responsible for this improvement.

For the first time in his career, Jackson made a second music video for a single. This second version was filmed in a prison with cell mates; in the video Jackson is seen handcuffed. It also contains real footage of police attacking African Americans (including the beating of Rodney King), the military crackdown of the protest in the Tiananmen Square, the Ku Klux Klan, war crimes, genocide, execution, martial law, and other human rights abuses. This version is rarely to never played on television and has less than a tenth of the views of the Rio video on YouTube.

The first music video of the song appears on the box set Visionary: The Video Singles, as well as on the video albums HIStory on Film, Volume II and Vision; the latter additionally includes the prison version.

In 2020, Spike Lee put together a third music video that incorporates pieces of both the Brazil and prison versions, as well as footage from various Black Lives Matter protests occurring around the world at that time.

Live performances
"They Don't Care About Us" was only performed as part of the opening medley for the HIStory World Tour, along with "Scream" and "In the Closet". The segment for "They Don't Care About Us" began with a short, military-style dance sequence and contained an excerpt of "HIStory". A short unedited video clip released after Jackson's death of the June 23, 2009 rehearsal for the This Is It concert series shows Jackson performing the song as the main song in a medley with parts of "HIStory," as well as "Why You Wanna Trip On Me" and "She Drives Me Wild" from Dangerous. The song was later remixed and featured as part of Cirque du Soleil's Michael Jackson: The Immortal World Tour.

Lyric dispute and context
On June 15, 1995, a day before the release of HIStory, The New York Times reported that "They Don't Care About Us" contained racist and anti-Semitic content. The publication highlighted the lyrics, "Jew me, sue me, everybody do me/ Kick me, kike me, don't you black or white me." Jackson responded directly to the publication, stating:

When questioned further about the lyrics on the ABC News program Prime Time Live, Jackson stated, "It's not anti-Semitic because I'm not a racist person ... I could never be a racist. I love all races." The singer also said that some of his closest employees and friends were Jewish. That same day, Jackson received support from his manager and record label, who described the lyrics as "brilliant", that they were about opposition to prejudice and taken out of context. The following day, two leading members of the Jewish community stated that Jackson's attempt to make a song critical of discrimination had backfired. They expressed the opinion that the lyrics used were unsuitable for a teenage audience that might not understand the song's context, adding that the song was too ambiguous for some listeners to understand. They accepted that Jackson meant well and suggested that the entertainer write an explanation in the album booklet.

On June 17, Jackson issued another public apology for his choice of words. He promised that future copies of the album would include an apology. By this point, however, two million copies of the record had already been shipped. The singer concluded, "I just want you all to know how strongly I am committed to tolerance, peace and love, and I apologize to anyone who might have been hurt." The next day, in his review of HIStory, Jon Pareles of The New York Times alleged, "In ... 'They Don't Care About Us', he gives the lie to his entire catalogue of brotherhood anthems with a burst of anti-Semitism."

On June 21, Patrick Macdonald of The Seattle Times criticized Jackson, stating, "He may have lived a sheltered life, but there really is no excuse for using terms like 'Jew me' and 'kike' in a pop song, unless you make it clear you are denouncing such terms, and do so in an artful way." Two days later, Jackson decided, despite the cost incurred, he would return to the studio and alter the offending wording on future copies of the album; "Jew me" and "Kike me" would be substituted with "do me" and "strike me". The music video and some copies of the album still carry the original words, but with loud, abstract noises partially drowning them out. He reiterated his acceptance that the song was offensive to some. Spike Lee defended Jackson's use of the word, by mentioning the double standard from the media. "While The New York Times asserted the use of racial slurs in 'They Don't Care About Us', they were silent on other racial slurs in the album. The Notorious B.I.G. says 'nigga' on "This Time Around," another song on the HIStory album, but it did not attract media attention, as well as, many years before, use in lyrics of word 'nigger' by John Lennon."

Track listings
 Europe CD single
 "They Don't Care About Us" – 4:43
 "They Don't Care About Us (Track Masters Remix)" – 4:07
 "They Don't Care About Us (Charles' Full Joint Remix)" – 4:56
 "Beat It (Moby's Sub Mix)" – 6:11

 US CD single
 "They Don't Care About Us" – 4:43
 "They Don't Care About Us (Charles' Full Joint Mix)" – 4:56
 "They Don't Care About Us (Dallas Main Mix)" – 5:20
 "They Don't Care About Us (Love To Infinity's Walk In The Park Radio Mix)" – 4:46
 "They Don't Care About Us (Love To Infinity's Classic Paradise Radio Mix)" – 4:14
 "They Don't Care About Us (Track Masters Radio Edit)" – 3:41
 "Rock With You (Frankie's Favorite Club Mix)" – 7:45
 "Earth Song (Hani's Club Experience)" – 7:55

Covers
The song was covered by the band Beast in Black as a bonus track on their 2021 album Dark Connection.

Remixes

 Dallas Austin Mix
 "They Don't Care About Us (Dallas Main Mix)" – 5:20
 Charles Roane Mixes
 "They Don't Care About Us (Charles' Full Joint Remix)" – 4:56
 "They Don't Care About Us (Charles' Full Joint Mix - No Intro)" – 4:36
 "They Don't Care About Us (Charles' Full Joint Mix - No Rap)" – 4:50
 Trackmasters Mixes
 "They Don't Care About Us (Trackmasters Remix)" – 4:07
 "They Don't Care About Us (Track Masters Radio Edit)" – 3:41
 "They Don't Care About Us (Track Masters Instrumental)" – 3:50 
 Love To Infinity Mixes
 "They Don't Care About Us (Love to Infinity's Classic Paradise Mix)" – 7:55
 "They Don't Care About Us (Love to Infinity's Classic Paradise Radio)" – 4:15
 "They Don't Care About Us (Love to Infinity's Walk in the Park Mix)" – 7:18
 "They Don't Care About Us (Love to Infinity's Walk in the Park Radio)" – 4:46 
 "They Don't Care About Us (Love to Infinity's Anthem of Love Mix)" – 7:45
 "They Don't Care About Us (Love to Infinity's Hacienda Mix)" – 7:10
 "They Don't Care About Us (Classic Dub)" – 7:55
 "They Don't Care About Us (Anthem of Love Dub)" – 7:45

Personnel
 Michael Jackson – lead vocals, backing vocals, percussion, keyboards, synthesizers, producer, synthesizer programming, vocal arrangements, rhythm arrangements, string arrangements
 Los Angeles Children's Choir – backing vocals
 Trevor Rabin – guitar
 Slash – additional guitar
 Brad Buxer – percussion, keyboards, synthesizers, synthesizer programming
 Chuck Wild – keyboards, synthesizers, synthesizer programming
 Jeff Bova, Jason Miles – keyboards, synthesizers
 Bruce Swedien – recording engineer, mixing
 Eddie De Lena – assistant recording engineer, mixing
 Matt Forger, Rob Hoffman – assistant recording engineers
 Annette Sander – choral arrangements

Charts

Weekly charts

Year-end charts

Certifications

References

1995 songs
1996 singles
African American–Jewish relations
American pop rock songs
Antisemitism in the United States
Epic Records singles
Michael Jackson songs
Music videos directed by Spike Lee
Number-one singles in the Czech Republic
Number-one singles in Germany
Number-one singles in Italy
Obscenity controversies in music
Protest songs
Song recordings produced by Michael Jackson
Songs written by Michael Jackson
Songs against racism and xenophobia
Dancehall songs
Blues songs